Thembisile "Thembi" Majola is the current Deputy Minister of Energy of South Africa in the cabinet of President Cyril Ramaphosa.

See also

African Commission on Human and Peoples' Rights
Constitution of South Africa
History of the African National Congress
Politics in South Africa
Provincial governments of South Africa

References

External links

Living people
African National Congress politicians
People from Soweto
Year of birth missing (living people)
Members of the National Assembly of South Africa